Anthoinite (IMA symbol: Atn) is an aluminium tungsten oxide mineral with the chemical formula AlWO(OH). Its type locality is Maniema in the Democratic Republic of the Congo.

References

External links 

 Anthoinite data sheet
 Anthoinite on the Handbook of Mineralogy

Aluminium minerals
Tungsten minerals
Oxide minerals